The Thynnidae (also known as thynnid wasps or flower wasps) are a family of large, solitary wasps whose larvae are almost universally parasitoids of various beetle larvae, especially those in the superfamily Scarabaeoidea. Until recently, the constituents of this family were classified in the family Tiphiidae, but multiple studies have independently confirmed that thynnids are a separate lineage.

Description 
Most species are small, but they can be up to 30 mm long. The females of some subfamilies (all Diamminae, Methochinae, and Thynninae) are wingless, and hunt ground-dwelling (fossorial) beetle larvae, or (in one species) mole crickets. The prey is paralysed with the female's sting, and an egg is laid on it so the wasp larva has a ready supply of food. In species where both sexes are winged, males are similar in size to the females, but are much more slender. The males of species with wingless females, however, are often much larger than the females and have wings; the adults mate in the air, with the female carried by the male's genitalia. Adults feed on nectar, and are minor pollinators. As some of the ground-dwelling scarab species attacked by thynnids are pests, some of these wasps are considered beneficial as biological control agents.

Taxonomy 

The family has five subfamilies, which were previously placed in Tiphiidae before it was found to be non-monophyletic.

Thynnidae genera are classified as:

Subfamily: Anthoboscinae
 Anthobosca Guérin-Ménéville, 1838
 Anthosila Genise, 1985
 Calchaquila Genise, 1985
 Cosila Guérin-Méneville, 1838
 Lalapa Pate, 1947
 Odontothynnus Cameron, 1904
 Paramyzine Berg, 1898

Subfamily: Diamminae
 Diamma Westwood, 1835

Subfamily: Methochinae
 Methocha Latreille, 1804
 Pterombrus Smith, 1869

Subfamily: Myzininae
 Allomeria Boni Bartalucci, 2007
 Braunsomeria Turner, 1912
 Meria Illiger, 1807
 Mesa Saussure, 1892
 Myzinum Latreille, 1803
 Poecilotiphia Cameron, 1902

Subfamily: Thynninae
 Aelurus Klug, 1840
 Aeolothynnus Ashmead, 1903
 Agriomyia Guérin-Ménéville, 1838
 Ammodromus Guérin-Méneville, 1838
 Argenthynnus Genise, 1991
 Ariphron Kimsey, 2007
 Arthrothynnus Brown, 1996
 Aspidothynnus Turner, 1910
 Aulacothynnus Turner, 1910
 Belothynnus Turner, 1910
 Brethynnus Genise,, 1991
 Campylothynnus Turner, 1910
 Catocheilus Guérin-Ménéville, 1842
 Chilothynnus Brown, 1996
 Chrysothynnus Turner, 1910
 Deuterothynnus Brown, 2010
 Dimorphothynnus Turner, 1910
 Doratithynnus Turner, 1910
 Dythynnus Kimsey, 2001
 Eirone Westwood, 1844
 Elaphroptera Guérin-Ménéville, 1838
 Elidothynnus Turner, 1910
 Epactiothynnus Turner, 1910
 Eucyrtothynnus Turner, 1910
 Glottynnus Genise, 1991
 Glottynoides  Kimsey, 1991
 Guerinius Ashmead, 1903
 Gymnothynnus Turner, 1910
 Hathynnus Kimsey, 2003
 Heligmothynnus Brown, 2010
 Hemithynnus Ashmead, 1903
 Kaysara Carnimeo & Noll, 2018
 Iswaroides Ashmead, 1899
 Leiothynnus Turner, 1910
 Lestricothynnus Turner, 1910
 Lophocheilus Guérin-Ménéville, 1842
 Macrothynnus Turner, 1908
 Mesothynnus Kimsey, 1991
 Neozeleboria Rohwer, 1910
 Oncorhinothynnus Salter, 1954
 Ornepetes Guérin, 1838
 Pampathynnus Carnimeo & Noll, 2018
 Phymatothynnus Turner, 1908
 Pogonothynnus Turner, 1910
 Psammothynnus Ashmead, 1903
 Pseudelaphroptera Ashmead, 1903
 Pseudoscotaena Carnimeo & Noll, 2018
 Rhagigaster Guérin-Ménéville, 1838
 Rhytidothynnus Brown, 2008
 Scotaena Klug, 1810
 Spilothynnus Ashmead, 1903
 Tachynoides Kimsey, 1996
 Tachynomyia Guérin-Ménéville, 1842
 Tachyphron Brown, 1995
 Tmesothynnus Turner, 1910
 Thynnoides Guérin-Ménéville, 1838
 Thynnoturneria Rohwer, 1910
 Thynnus Fabricius, 1775
 Zaspilothynnus Ashmead, 1903
 Zeena Kimsey, 1991
 Zeleboria Saussure, 1867

References

External links

 Myzinum maculata Fabricius, a thynnid wasp on the UF / IFAS Featured Creatures Web site
 

Apocrita families
Insects used as insect pest control agents